The Nostoi (Nostoi, "Returns"), also known as Returns or Returns of the Greeks, is a lost epic of ancient Greek literature. It was one of the Epic Cycle, that is, the Trojan cycle, which told the entire history of the Trojan War in epic verse. The story of the Nostoi comes chronologically after that of the Iliou persis (Sack of Ilium), and is followed by that of the Odyssey. The author of the Nostoi is uncertain; ancient writers attributed the poem variously to Agias (8th century BC), Homer (8th century BC), and Eumelos (8th century BC) (see Cyclic poets). The poem comprised five books of verse in dactylic hexameter. The word nostos means "return home".

Date
The date of composition of the Nostoi, and the date when it was set in writing, are both very uncertain. The text is most likely to have been finalized in the seventh or sixth century BCE.

Content
The Nostoi relates the return home of the Greek heroes after the end of the Trojan War. In current critical editions only five and a half lines of the poem's original text survive. Current understandings on its storyline are almost entirely confined to a summary of the Cyclic epics contained in the chrestomathy attributed to an unknown Proklos (possibly to be identified with the 2nd century AD grammarian Eutychios Proklos). A few other references also give indications of the poem's storyline.

The poem opens as the Greeks are getting ready to set sail back to Greece. The goddess Athena is wrathful because of the Greeks' impious behaviour in the sack of Troy (see Iliou persis). Agamemnon waits behind, to appease her; Diomedes and Nestor set sail straightaway, and reach home safely; Menelaus sets sail, but encounters a storm, loses most of his ships, lands in Egypt and is delayed there for several years. Other Greeks, including the prophet Calchas, go by land to Kolophon, where Calchas dies and is buried.

As Agamemnon is getting ready to sail, Achilles's ghost appears to him and foretells his fate. Agamemnon makes a sacrifice and sets sail anyway; Neoptolemus, however, is visited by his grandmother, the sea-nymph Thetis, who tells him to wait and make further sacrifices to the gods. Zeus sends a storm against Agamemnon and those accompanying him at Athena's request, and the lesser Ajax dies on the Kapherian rocks on the southern end of Euboia. Neoptolemus follows Thetis's advice and goes home by land; in Thrace he meets Odysseus at Maroneia, who has traveled there by sea. Neoptolemus arrives home, though Phoenix dies en route, and there he is recognised by his grandfather Peleus.

Agamemnon arrives home and is there murdered by his wife Clytemnestra and her lover, Agamemnon's cousin Aegisthus. Later Agamemnon's and Clytemnestra's son Orestes avenges the murder by killing both of them. Finally Menelaus arrives home from Egypt. (This last section, known as the Oresteia, is narrated in Odyssey books 3 and 4 by Nestor and Menelaos; and it was later also the basis for Aeschylus' trilogy of tragic plays, the Oresteia.)

At the end of the Nostoi the only living Greek hero who still has not returned home is Odysseus. His return is narrated in the Odyssey.

Editions
Online editions (English translation):
Fragments of the Nostoi translated by H.G. Evelyn-White, 1914 (public domain)
Fragments of complete Epic Cycle translated by H.G. Evelyn-White, 1914; Project Gutenberg edition
Proklos' summary of the Epic Cycle translated by Gregory Nagy
Print editions (Greek):
A. Bernabé 1987, Poetarum epicorum Graecorum testimonia et fragmenta pt. 1 (Leipzig: Teubner)
M. Davies 1988, Epicorum Graecorum fragmenta (Göttingen: Vandenhoek & Ruprecht)
Print editions (Greek with English translation):
M.L. West 2003, Greek Epic Fragments (Cambridge, Massachusetts: Harvard University Press)

See also
Nostos

References

 Burgess, Jonathan S., The Tradition of the Trojan War in Homer and the Epic Cycle, The Johns Hopkins University Press, (2004). . (p. 180).
 Davies, Malcolm; Greek Epic Cycle, Duckworth Publishers; 2 edition (May 2, 2001). .
 Evelyn-White, Hugh G., Hesiod the Homeric Hymns and Homerica, BiblioBazaar (March 13, 2007). .

8th-century BC books
7th-century BC books
6th-century BC books
7th-century BC poems
6th-century BC poems
Epic Cycle
Homer
Lost poems